The A&WP Subdivision is a railroad line that is part of the Atlanta Division, which is owned by CSX Transportation in the U.S. states of Alabama and Georgia. The line runs from Union City, Georgia, to Montgomery, Alabama, for a total of 157.6 miles. At its north end it continues south from the Atlanta Terminal Subdivision Chart D and at its south end it continues south as the M&M Subdivision.

See also
 List of CSX Transportation lines
 Atlanta and West Point Railroad
 Montgomery and West Point Railroad
 Western Railway of Alabama

References

CSX Transportation lines
Rail infrastructure in Alabama
Rail infrastructure in Georgia (U.S. state)